"House Every Weekend" is the debut single from British DJ David Zowie. It was released on 3 July 2015 by Virgin EMI Records.

Background
The song began as an embryo which Zowie produced in his studio – he found some acapellas on his PC from a Nervous Records vinyl containing part of the vocal – and was written with the intent of being a feel-good track based on the lyrics. However, the vocalist initially sung about being trapped in the house during the weekend. Zowie then flipped the lyrics to create a more positive scenario. The track's first play was at a house party with his friends. A DJ who was at the party asked for a copy of the record, and in turn played it out. This was subsequently picked up by other DJs, who used it as a warm-up track, and was used by such clubs and events as Egg, Defected and Audio Rehab. It was then picked up by The Magician and Alex Metric, who used it on their American tours, which in turn brought it to the attention of Pete Tong and Annie Mac, who subsequently used in on their BBC Radio 1 shows.

Commercial performance
On 8 July 2015, the Official Charts Company announced that "House Every Weekend" was number one in the Official Chart Update, and was scheduled to be the Official Charts Company's first Friday number one (they moved the date the chart was announced from Sunday to Friday, giving it five days of sales that week) since 1960. Prior to being released, the song had made it to number 52 entirely on streams, debuting at number 80. On 10 July, the song topped the UK Singles Chart, beating "Shine" by Years & Years by less than 1,000 copies.

Music video
A music video was produced for the song. It has been described as "a heartfelt paean to an underground scene that holds the dance as a means of expression as well as a movement". Visuals for the track are currently produced by CRYbaby Media.

Track listing

Charts and certifications

Weekly charts

Certifications

Year-end charts

Release history

See also 
 List of UK Singles Chart number ones of 2015
 List of UK Dance Singles Chart number ones of 2015

References

2015 singles
2015 songs
UK Singles Chart number-one singles
Virgin EMI Records singles